Naibiidae is an extinct family of aphids in the order Hemiptera. There are at least three genera and four described species in Naibiidae.

Genera
These three genera belong to the family Naibiidae:
 † Coccavus Shcherbakov, 2007
 † Naibia Shcherbakov, 2007
 † Panirena Shcherbakov, 2007

References

Sternorrhyncha
Prehistoric insect families